La Thuile is a town and comune in the Aosta Valley  of northwest Italy.

Geography

La Thuile is located in the Alps at the extreme north-west of the country, close to the French alpine town of La Rosière.  The town is crossed by the road going from Pré-Saint-Didier in the north-west up to the Little St Bernard Pass in the south-east linking Italy to Bourg-Saint-Maurice and the Isère Valley in France.

Economy
Coal mining (anthracite) was important in the area before World War II, many diggings and old mining structures can be seen around the village. Nowadays, La Thuile depends on tourism, in winter as one of the main Italian Alpine ski resorts linked with La Rosière, as well as in summer (hiking).

Events
La Thuile has been the venue for several major annual international winter conferences: "Les Rencontres de Physique de la Vallée d'Aoste" organized by Italy's Institute of Nuclear Physics, and "Rencontres de Moriond" organized by the French National institute of nuclear and particle physics (IN2P3).

In February 2016 the slopes of La Thuile hosted, for the first time in history, three competitions (two downhill and one super G) valid for the FIS Alpine Ski World Cup female. In 2020, the female worldcup returned to the 3 Franco Berthod on Saturday 29 February and Sunday 1 March 2020, respectively with the downhill and the super-G, but the latter was cancelled due to bad weather. 

Enduro World series visited La Thuile in 2014 and will host round 4 of the Enduro World Series in 2016.

Transportation
Public transportation includes regular buses connecting La Thuile to Pré-Saint-Didier, the latter has a railway station connected to the Italian railway network via Aosta.

International relations

Twin towns – Sister cities
La Thuile is twinned with:
 Alassio in Italy
 Laigueglia in Italy

References

Cities and towns in Aosta Valley